Willard Sterne Randall is an American historian and author who specializes in biographies related to the American colonial period and the American Revolution. He teaches American history at Champlain College in Burlington, Vermont.

Publications

References

Sources
Contemporary Authors, vol. 196. pp. 305–323.
Who's Who in America, 2011.

External links

Booknotes interview with Randall on ''Thomas Jefferson: A Life, December 26, 1993
Who's Who in America, 2011; Contemporary Authors, volume 196, pp. 305–323.
Podcast interview with Randall on ''Unshackling America – How the War of 1812 Truly Ended the American Revolution  , July  13, 2017

Living people
21st-century American historians
21st-century American male writers
Historians of the United States
Writers from Burlington, Vermont
1942 births
American male non-fiction writers